Mark Sheals is an actor, and professional rugby league footballer who played in the 1980s and 1990s. He played at representative level for Wales, and at club level for Swinton, Leigh (Heritage No. 1009), Oldham (Heritage No.) and Wakefield Trinity (Heritage No. 1060).

International honours
Mark Sheals won caps for Wales while a Welsh Student in 1995 1-cap.

Acting career
Mark Sheals played "Dessie the Gangster" in episode 15 of series 5 of the Channel 4 television drama series Shameless.

References

External links
Statistics at orl-heritagetrust.org.uk
Gregory rejects Lions talk
Sheals ready to wait to make his Mark
Rugby League: Team-by-team guide to the Stones Bitter Championship (1993)
Rugby League: Team-by-team guide to the Stones Bitter Championship (1992)

1963 births
Living people
English male television actors
Leigh Leopards players
Oldham R.L.F.C. players
Place of birth missing (living people)
Swinton Lions players
Wakefield Trinity players
Wales national rugby league team players
Welsh rugby league players